This is a list of the 1965 PGA Tour Qualifying School graduates.

There were 49 players at the 1965 event. The school began on Monday October 25 and lasted 10 days in total. During the first three days, the players exclusively attended lectures. The topics included player conduct, the rules of golf, the relationship between golf and the law, and a number of other issues. Professional golfers like Chick Harbert, Jack Burke Jr., and Dave Marr provided the lectures.

On Thursday October 28, the golf tournament proper began. It was played at PGA National Golf Club in Palm Beach Gardens, Florida over 144 holes and lasted one week. Seventeen players graduated.

According to Billy Booe, PGA Tournament Administrator, "it was not an impressive group" of graduates. As of May 1966, only 4 of the 17 of them had made any money on tour and only two of them had been in the money multiple times.

Source:

References

PGA Tour Qualifying School
Golf in Florida
PGA Tour Qualifying School
PGA Tour Qualifying School